Allalapatty is a small village located in Pappireddipatty taluk, Dharmapuri district.

Villages in Dharmapuri district